Barra do Rio Mamanguape Environmental Protection Area is a protected area of 14,640 hectares in the estuary of the Mamanguape River in the  state of Paraíba, Brazil.

Foundation

There was a drive to develop sugar cane plantations in the region in the 1970s.
The resulting massive loss of Atlantic Forest created pressure to use the mangroves in the Mamanguape River estuary as wood for construction, despite the poor quality of the wood and the value of the mangroves as shelter for crabs, clams, oysters and fish.
It is administered by the Chico Mendes Institute for Biodiversity Conservation.

The area includes parts of the Baía da Traição, Lucena, Marcação and Rio Tinto municipalities of Paraíba.
It is IUCN protected area category V (protected landscape/seascape).
The overall purpose is to control land use, protect biodiversity and ensure sustainable use of natural resources. Specific objectives include conserving the habitat of the West Indian manatee (Trichechus manatus), conserving the remaining mangrove and rainforest, and promoting eco-tourism.

Environment

The Barra do Rio Mamanguape is a relatively secluded area on the north coast of Paraiba with sandy beaches, dunes, reefs and well-preserved mangroves.
It is the main area where the manatee is found, and the main breeding area.
The area contains remnants of the Atlantic Forest biome.
Its importance is linked to its estuary ecosystem, which includes the manatee, species highly threatened in the area.

Notes

Sources

Environmental protection areas of Brazil
Protected areas of Paraíba